Boechout is a municipality of Belgium located in the Flemish province of Antwerp.

In 2021, Boechout had a total population of 13,526. The total area is 20.66 km².

Boechout also hosts the Sfinks Festival.

History 
Boechout is first mentioned in 974 as Villa Buocholt and a possession of the Saint Bavo's Abbey in Ghent. It used to be part of the Duchy of Brabant. In 1357, Antwerp, Boechout, Hove and several other villages were acquired by the Count of Flanders, but was returned to Brabant in 1406. The village was severely damaged by war several times in the 16th century and again during World War I. In 1977, the municipality  was merged into Boechout.

Climate

Notable people
 Jan Cockx (1891–1976), painter
 Jimmy De Jonghe (born 1992), footballer
 Roger Rosiers (born 1946), former professional road racing cyclist
 Jan Frans Willems (1793–1846), writer and father of the Flemish movement

Gallery

References

External links
 
  Official Boechout & Vremde website

Municipalities of Antwerp Province
Populated places in Antwerp Province
Boechout